The contact process is a stochastic process used to model population growth on the set of sites  of a graph in which occupied sites become vacant at a constant rate, while vacant sites become occupied at a rate proportional to the number of occupied neighboring sites. Therefore, if we denote by  the proportionality constant, each site remains occupied for a random time period which is exponentially distributed parameter 1 and places descendants at every vacant neighboring site at times of events of a  Poisson process parameter  during this period. All processes are independent of one another and of the random period of time sites remains occupied. 
The contact process can also be interpreted as a model for the spread of an infection by 

The main quantity of interest is the number of particles in the process, say , in the first interpretation, which corresponds to the number of infected sites in the second one. Therefore, the process survives whenever the number of particles is positive for all times, which corresponds to the case that there are always infected individuals in the second one. For any infinite graph  there exists a positive and finite critical value  so that if  then survival of the process starting from a finite number of particles occurs with positive probability, while if  their extinction is almost certain.

Mathematical Definition 
The contact process is a continuous-time Markov process with state space , where  is a finite or countable graph, usually , and a special case of an interacting particle system.
More specifically, the dynamics of the basic contact process is defined by the following transition rates: at site ,

This means that each site waits an exponential time with the corresponding rate, and then flips (so 0 becomes 1 and vice versa).

Connection to Percolation
The contact process is a stochastic process that is closely connected to percolation theory. 

The Law of large numbers on the integers

A weak law of large numbers (that the process converges in probability) was shown by Durrett (1980). A few years later, Durrett and Griffeath (1983) improved this to a strong law of large numbers, giving almost sure convergence of the process.

Die out at criticality

For contact process on all integer lattices, a major breakthrough came in 1990 when Bezuidenhout and Grimmett showed that the contact process also dies out almost surely at the critical value.

Durrett's conjecture and the central limit theorem

Durrett conjectured in survey papers and lecture notes during the 80s and early 90s  regarding the central limit theorem for the Harris' contact process, viz. that, if the process survives, then for all large ,  equals  and the error equals  multiplied by a (random) error distributed according to a standard Gaussian distribution. 

References 

 C. Bezuidenhout and G. R. Grimmett, The critical contact process dies out, Ann. Probab. 18 (1990), 1462–1482.

 Durrett, Richard (1988). "Lecture Notes on Particle Systems and Percolation",  Wadsworth.  
  Durrett, Richard (1991). "The contact process, 1974–1989." Cornell University, Mathematical Sciences Institute.

 

 Thomas M. Liggett, "Stochastic Interacting Systems: Contact, Voter and Exclusion Processes", Springer-Verlag, 1999.

Stochastic processes
Lattice models